The first season of Saturday Night Live (then known as NBC's Saturday Night to avoid confusion with the similarly named variety show hosted by Howard Cosell), an American sketch comedy series, originally aired in the United States on NBC from October 11, 1975, to July 31, 1976. The show served as a vehicle that launched to stardom the careers of a number of major comedians and actors, including Chevy Chase, John Belushi, and Dan Aykroyd.

History 
In 1974, NBC Tonight Show host Johnny Carson asked that the weekend broadcasts of "Best of Carson" (officially known as The Weekend Tonight Show Starring Johnny Carson) come to an end (The Tonight Show was a 90-minute program at the time), so he could take two weeknights off; NBC would thus air those repeats on those nights rather than feed them to affiliates for broadcast on either Saturdays or Sundays. Given Johnny Carson's undisputed status as the king of late-night television, NBC heard his request as an ultimatum, fearing he might use the issue as grounds to defect to either ABC or CBS. To fill the gap, the network drew up some ideas and brought in Dick Ebersol – a protégé of legendary ABC Sports president Roone Arledge – to develop a 90-minute late-night variety show. Dick Ebersol's first order of business was hiring a young Canadian producer named Lorne Michaels to be the show-runner.

Television production in New York was already in decline in the mid-1970s (The Tonight Show had departed for Los Angeles two years prior), so NBC decided to base the show at their studios in Rockefeller Center to offset the overhead of maintaining those facilities. Lorne Michaels was given Studio 8H, a converted radio studio that prior to that point was most famous for having hosted Arturo Toscanini and the NBC Symphony Orchestra from 1937 to 1951, but was being used largely for network election coverage by the mid-1970s.

When the first show aired on October 11, 1975, with George Carlin as its host, it was called NBC's Saturday Night because ABC featured a program at the same time titled Saturday Night Live with Howard Cosell. After ABC cancelled the Cosell program in 1976, the NBC program changed its name to Saturday Night Live, starting with the 17th episode of the second seasonthe episode hosted by Jack Burns on March 26, 1977 (and subsequently picked up Bill Murray from Cosell's show in 1977, as well). Every night, Don Pardo introduced the cast, a job he would hold for 39 years until his death in 2014.

The original concept was for a comedy-variety show featuring young comedians, live musical performances, short films by Albert Brooks and segments by Jim Henson featuring atypically adult and abstract characters from The Muppets world. Rather than have one permanent host, Lorne Michaels elected to have a different guest host each week. The first episode featured two musical guests (Billy Preston and Janis Ian), and the second episode, hosted by Paul Simon on October 18, was almost entirely a musical variety show with various acts. The Not Ready for Prime Time Players did not appear in this episode at all, other than as the bees with Paul Simon telling them they were cancelled, and Chevy Chase in the opening and in "Weekend Update". Over the course of Season 1, sketch comedy would begin to dominate the show and SNL would more closely resemble its current format.

Andy Kaufman made several appearances over the season, while The Muppets' Land of Gorch bits were essentially cancelled after episode 10, although the associated Muppet characters still made sporadic appearances after that. After one final appearance at the start of season two, the Muppet characters were permanently dropped from SNL.

During the season, Lorne Michaels appeared on-camera twice, on April 24 and May 22, to make an offer to The Beatles to reunite on the show. In the first appearance, he offered a certified check of $3,000. In the second appearance, he increased his offer to $3,200 and free hotel accommodations. John Lennon and Paul McCartney later both admitted they had been watching SNL from Lennon's apartment on May8 (the episode after Lorne Michaels' first offer) and briefly toyed with actually going down to the studio, but decided to stay in the apartment because they were too tired.

Cast

Changes and notes
The first cast member hired was Gilda Radner. The rest of the cast included fellow Second City alumni Dan Aykroyd and John Belushi, as well as National Lampoon "Lemmings" alumnus Chevy Chase (whose trademark became his usual falls and opening spiel that cued the show's opening) who was chosen as anchor for Weekend Update, Jane Curtin, Garrett Morris, and Groundlings alumnus Laraine Newman. The original head writer was Michael O'Donoghue, a writer at National Lampoon who had worked alongside several cast members while directing The National Lampoon Radio Hour. The original theme music was written by future Academy Award–winning composer Howard Shore, who – along with his band (occasionally billed as the "All Nurse Band" or "Band of Angels") – was the original band leader on the show. Paul Shaffer, who would go on to lead David Letterman's band on Late Night and then The Late Show, was also band leader in the early years.

Much of the talent pool involved in the inaugural season was recruited from the National Lampoon Radio Hour, a nationally syndicated comedy series that often satirized current events.

This would be the only season for George Coe and Michael O'Donoghue as official cast members. While George Coe was billed only in the premiere, he was seen in various small roles through the season before leaving the show altogether. Michael O'Donoghue was credited through the (first) Candice Bergen episode and would continue to work for the show as a writer, as well as an occasionally featured performer (particularly as "Mr. Mike"), through season 5.

Cast roster
The Not Ready for Prime Time Players
Dan Aykroyd
John Belushi
Chevy Chase
George Coe (only episode: October 11, 1975)
Jane Curtin
Garrett Morris
Laraine Newman
Michael O'Donoghue (final episode: November 8, 1975)
Gilda Radner

Bold denotes Weekend Update anchor

Writers

The original writing staff included Anne Beatts, Chevy Chase, Tom Davis, Al Franken, Lorne Michaels, Marilyn Suzanne Miller, Michael O'Donoghue, Herb Sargent, Tom Schiller, Rosie Shuster and Alan Zweibel. The head writers were Lorne Michaels and Michael O'Donoghue.

Episodes

References

01
Saturday Night Live in the 1970s
1975 American television seasons
1976 American television seasons